"There Ain't Nothin' Wrong with the Radio" is a song co-written and recorded by American country music artist Aaron Tippin.  It was released in February 1992 as the first single from his album  Read Between the Lines.  The song is not only his first Number One hit on the country music charts but also his longest-lasting at three weeks.  Tippin wrote the song, along with Buddy Brock.

Content
"There Ain't Nothin' Wrong with the Radio" is a moderate up-tempo novelty song. In it, the male narrator describes how old and run-down his car is but explains that he continues to drive it because "there ain't nothin' wrong with the radio" — specifically, "there ain't a country station that [he] can't tune in". The song features electric guitar and fiddle accompaniments.

Music video
The music video was directed by John Lloyd Miller and premiered in early-1992. It shows Tippin performing at a concert sporting a mullet.

Other versions
Tippin performed the song with Alvin and the Chipmunks on their 1992 album Chipmunks in Low Places. In this version, Simon repeatedly attempts to correct the song's grammar, singing "there isn't anything wrong with the radio". Tippin then explains that the song is supposed to have grammatical errors because it is country.

Chart positions
"There Ain't Nothin' Wrong with the Radio" debuted at number 54 on Billboard Hot Country Singles & Tracks (now Hot Country Songs) for the chart week of February 15, 1992. On the chart week of April 18, 1992, it became Tippin's first Number One hit, holding the position for three weeks and then falling to number 10. It was also his only Number One on the RPM Country Tracks charts in Canada.

Year-end charts

References

1992 singles
Aaron Tippin songs
Song recordings produced by Emory Gordy Jr.
Songs written by Aaron Tippin
RCA Records singles
Music videos directed by John Lloyd Miller
Songs written by Buddy Brock
1992 songs
Songs about radio
Songs about cars